Booneville is a city in Logan County, Arkansas, United States and the county seat of its southern district. Located in the Arkansas River Valley between the Ouachita and Ozark Mountains, the city is one of the oldest in western Arkansas. The city's economy was first based upon the railroad and Arkansas State Tuberculosis Sanatorium. It has developed a diverse economy of small businesses and light industry. Booneville's population was 3,990 at the 2010 census.

Booneville supports a community center, a senior-citizens center, a community hospital, a municipal airport, and new school facilities.  Hunting, fishing, camping, hiking, and other outdoors activities are readily available in nearby national forests and state parks.

History

Naming
The city was founded in 1828 when Walter Cauthron, an early explorer of the Arkansas Territory, built a log cabin and store along the Petit Jean River. By some accounts, he intended to name the community as "Bonneville" for friend Benjamin Bonneville, but the spelling and name were later changed. Another theory is that the name was to honor Daniel Boone, a friend of the Logan family for whom the county is named.

2008 explosion of meat-packing plant
On March 23, 2008, A fire set off multiple explosions at the Cargill Meat Solutions plant in Booneville. According to local authorities the explosions caused an ammonia gas leak that forced 180 people from their homes. There were no reported injuries of the accident. The fire was reportedly started from an accident caused by welders doing repairs on fans in a freezer section. The Cargill Meat plant was the towns largest employer at the time of the explosions.

Geography
Booneville is located at  (35.139650, -93.921272).

Booneville is near Blue Mountain Lake, a lake popular for fishing, boating, and swimming. Five United States Army Corps of Engineers  recreation areas are available for public lake access. At the east end of the lake, the Blue Mountain Wildlife Demonstration Area is a world-class bird-dog field area. This area also hosts visitors interested in hiking, birding, and mountain bike riding.

Climate

Demographics

2020 census

As of the 2020 United States census, there were 3,809 people, 1,439 households, and 855 families residing in the city.

2000 census
As of the census of 2000, 4,117 people, 1,619 households, and 1,109 families were residing in the city. The 1,863 housing units averaged 457.0 per square mile (176.3/km2). The racial makeup of the city was 96.62% White, 0.05% African American, 1.12% Native American, 0.27% Asian, 0.05% Pacific Islander, 0.17% from other races, and 1.72% from two or more races. About 0.87% of the population was Hispanic or Latino of any race.

Of the 1,619 households, 34.8% had children under the age of 18 living with them, 51.3% were married couples living together, 13.3% had a female householder with no husband present, and 31.5% were not families. About 28.5% of all households were made up of individuals, and 16.2% had someone living alone who was 65 years of age or older. The average household size was 2.48, and the average family size was 3.01.

In the city, the population was distributed as 28.0% under the age of 18, 8.1% from 18 to 24, 26.4% from 25 to 44, 20.0% from 45 to 64, and 17.5% who were 65 years of age or older.  The median age was 36 years. For every 100 females, there were 88.9 males.  For every 100 females age 18 and over, there were 82.1 males.

Males had a median income of $25,238 versus $20,092 for females. The per capita income for the city was $13,076. About 13.1% of families and 18.4% of the population were below the poverty line, including 22.0% of those under age 18 and 23.9% of those age 65 or over.

Education

From its early days, Booneville has supported education.  In 1874, as a response to needs for higher learning in western Arkansas, the Fort Smith District of the Methodist Episcopal Church, South, authorized the establishment of the Fort Smith District High School in Booneville, 40 miles to the west.  Local church members donated the land, building materials, and labor.  The school, located on South College Street, was to be supported by student tuition fees.  Students came from towns all over western Arkansas to board with Booneville families and attend a school that offered an advanced curriculum, including Latin, German, advanced mathematics, literature, and music.  The school functioned until the early 1900s.

After the school closed, a group of residents and business leaders formed the Booneville Education Association and acquired  of land in the northwest part of town.  The new school was called the Booneville Co-Educational Institute and also offered a more advanced curriculum than the public school around.  Graduates were admitted as sophomores at the University of Arkansas at Fayetteville.

In 1920, state funds were made available for the support of public high schools and the school's property was transferred to the Booneville School District.  The building continued to be used as the city's high school until a new building was built in 1929.  The old Co-Educational Institute building was used as the Booneville elementary school for several decades after that.

Infrastructure

Transportation

The city is located at the intersection of Highway 23 (commonly known as the "Pig Trail") and Highway 10. Both routes are designated as Arkansas Scenic Byways near Booneville. Highway 217 also runs north and south from the city.

Rights-of-way for downtown city streets dedicated during the original town plat are wider than in most communities.

Water/wastewater
The city of Booneville owns the Booneville Water Department, which treats and distributes potable water from Lake Booneville to the residents and commercial users of the city in accordance with Arkansas Department of Health regulations.

The Booneville Water Department also collects and treats wastewater in accordance with a Clean Water Act National Pollutant Discharge Elimination System permit issued and administrated by the Arkansas Department of Environmental Quality.  Treated effluent is discharged to Booneville Creek, ultimately draining to the Arkansas River.

Notable people
Kimberly Foster, television and movie actor, is best known for her role as Michelle Stevens in the later seasons of the primetime soap opera Dallas.
Elizabeth Ward Gracen was Miss America 1982 and an actress on Highlander: The Series.
Tom Greenway was a character actor in numerous TV series of 1950s and '60s such as Gunsmoke, Bonanza, Dragnet, and Perry Mason.
John P. McConnell was chief of staff of the United States Air Force from February 1, 1965, to July 31, 1969.
Floyd Speer, pitcher for the Chicago White Sox, played MLB from April 25, 1943, to May 3, 1944. He is buried in the Carolan Community Cemetery.
Aaron Lee Ward, former Baseball player and member of the New York Yankees first World Series championship team 1923
Paul X. Williams, a federal judge for the Western District of Arkansas, was appointed by President Lyndon B. Johnson.

See also

References

External links
Arkansas State Tuberculosis Sanatorium Historic Site
Booneville Democrat -- Local Weekly Newspaper (On-Line Version)
 "Every Day Was Tuesday" The Arkansas TB Sanatorium

 
Cities in Arkansas
Cities in Logan County, Arkansas
County seats in Arkansas
Populated places established in 1878
Populated places established in 1899
1828 establishments in Arkansas Territory